The Aberystwyth Observer (established in 1858) was a weekly conservative English language newspaper in Wales.

The paper was distributed in Ceredigion, West Montgomeryshire, and South Merionethshire. It contained general and local news and information, and a list of visitors. It was published by David Jenkins.

References

Newspapers published in Wales